is a Japanese anime series based on the manga series of the same name by Sakae Esuno. The plot depicts the Diary Game, a deadly battle royal between 12 different individuals who are given "Future Diaries," special diaries that can predict the future, by Deus Ex Machina, the God of Time and Space, with the last survivor becoming his heir. Future Diary follows Yukiteru "Yuki" Amano, a socially awkward boy and one of the game's contestants who only wants to survive; Yuno Gasai, another one of the game's contestants and a friend, who would do anything to be with Yuki; Minene Uryū, another contestant who is an infamous spy with a grudge against God; and Aru Akise, a genius teen detective and a friend of Yuki who investigates the true purpose of the game and Yuno's dark secrets.

The anime is produced by Studio Asread, directed by Naoto Hosoda, the script is written by Katsuhiko Takayama, character designs are by Hidetsugu Hirayama and art direction is by Toshiyuki Tokuda. The anime aired from October 10, 2011 to  April 16, 2012 on Chiba TV and TV Saitama. The series is licensed by Funimation in North America and Kaze UK in the United Kingdom. An original video animation (OVA) based on the spin-off manga, Future Diary: Redial, was streamed on Niconico on June 19, 2013, and released on DVD with the manga volume in July 2013. From episode 15, the second opening and ending theme songs are "Dead End" by Faylan and "Filament" by Yousei Teikoku, respectively.

All episode titles are terms related to modern cellphones and telephone business in general, reflecting the fact that most Future Diaries are based on their users' mobile phones. At the end of every episode, Murmur is featured in a segment of backstories with the various characters who appear in the anime series.

Episode list

Future Diary

Future Diary: Redial

References

External links
List of Future Diary episode titles 

Future Diary